Wretham Park Meres is a  biological Site of Special Scientific Interest north of Thetford in Norfolk.

This site consists of four natural lakes, Mickle Mere, Hill Mere, Rush Mere and West Mere, which provide a breeding habitat for wildfowl such as mallards, gadwalls, shovelers, tufted ducks and teal. There are also many wintering ducks.

The site is private land with no public access.

References

Sites of Special Scientific Interest in Norfolk